Piper generalense is a species of plant in the family Piperaceae. It is native to Costa Rica.

References

Flora of Costa Rica
generalense
Taxa named by William Trelease